Martin Ford may refer to:
Martin Ford (author) (fl. 2000s–2020s), American non-fiction writer and futurist
Martin Ford (cricketer) (born 1978), English cricketer
Martin Ford (politician) (fl. 1980s–2020s), Scottish politician

See also
Martyn Ford (born 1944), English orchestral musician
Martin Forde (born 1923), American labor union